The Vorumloc (in its upper course also: Motiș) is a left tributary of the river Târnava Mare in Romania. It discharges into the Târnava Mare in Copșa Mică.

References

Rivers of Romania
Rivers of Sibiu County